Illumination problems are a class of mathematical problems that study the illumination of rooms with mirrored walls by point light sources.

Original formulation
The original formulation was attributed to Ernst Straus in the 1950s and has been resolved. Straus asked whether a room with mirrored walls can always be illuminated by a single point light source, allowing for repeated reflection of light off the mirrored walls. Alternatively, the question can be stated as asking that if a billiard table can be constructed in any required shape, is there a shape possible such that there is a point where it is impossible to hit the billiard ball at another point, assuming the ball is point-like and continues infinitely rather than stopping due to friction.

Penrose unilluminable room
The original problem was first solved in 1958 by Roger Penrose using ellipses to form the Penrose unilluminable room. He showed that there exists a room with curved walls that must always have dark regions if lit only by a single point source.

Polygonal rooms

This problem was also solved for polygonal rooms by George Tokarsky in 1995 for 2 and 3 dimensions, which showed that there exists an unilluminable polygonal 26-sided room with a "dark spot" which is not illuminated from another point in the room, even allowing for repeated reflections. These were rare cases, when a finite number of dark points (rather than regions) are unilluminable only from a fixed position of the point source.

In 1997, two different 24-sided rooms with the same properties were put forward by George Tokarsky and David Castro separately.

In 1995, Tokarsky found the first polygonal unilluminable room which had 4 sides and two fixed boundary points.
In 2016, Samuel Lelièvre, Thierry Monteil, and Barak Weiss showed that a light source in a polygonal room whose angles (in degrees) are all rational numbers will illuminate the entire polygon, with the possible exception of a finite number of points. In 2019 this was strengthened by Amit Wolecki who showed that for each such polygon, the number of pairs of points which do not illuminate each other is finite.

References

External links
 "The Illumination Problem – Numberphile", on YouTube by Numberphile, Feb 28, 2017
 "Penrose Unilluminable Room Is Impossible To Light", on YouTube by Steve Mould, May 19, 2022
 "The mushroom's shape does not matter in Penrose's unilluminable room", on YouTube by Nils Berglund, Aug 13, 2022
 "The Tokarsky original unilluminable room with 24 sides", on YouTube by George Tokarsky, Jun 16, 2022
 "Egyptian hieroglyphs: An Odd Tokarsky unilluminable room", on YouTube by George Tokarsky, Jul 15, 2022
 "Eureka! The first polygonal unilluminable room", on YouTube by George Tokarsky, Jul 29, 2022
 An interactive demonstration, on Wolfram demonstrations project

Mathematical problems
Dynamical systems